The 2nd West Virginia Infantry Regiment  was an infantry regiment that served in the Union Army during the American Civil War. On May 23, 1863, it was converted to a mounted infantry by Brigadier General William W. Averell. The regiment was immediately sent to a camp for instruction and supplied. In 1864, it was converted to the 5th West Virginia Volunteer Cavalry Regiment.

Mustering

The 2nd West Virginia Infantry Regiment (originally known as the 2nd Virginia) was mustered into Federal service in mid-1861 by companies as follows;
 
Company "A" was recruited in Pittsburgh, Pennsylvania, and not accepted by its home state.  It moved to Wheeling, Virginia (now West Virginia), and was mustered in on May 21, 1861.
Company "B" known as the "Grafton Guards," from Grafton was mustered in on May 25, 1861, at Wheeling. Commanded by Captain George R. Latham.
Company "C" from Wheeling was mustered in there on June 1, 1861.
Company "D" was recruited in Pittsburgh and not accepted by its home state.  It moved to Wheeling and was mustered in on June 14, 1861.
Company "E" from Wheeling was mustered in there on June 16, 1861.
Company "F"  was recruited in Pittsburgh and not accepted by its home state.  It moved to Wheeling and was mustered in on June 24, 1861.
Company "G"  was recruited in Pittsburgh and not accepted by its home state.  It moved to Wheeling and was mustered in on June 13, 1861.
Company "H" was recruited in Ironton, Ohio, and not accepted by its home state.  It moved to Wheeling and was mustered in on June 28, 1861.
Company "I" was recruited in Washington County, Pennsylvania, and not accepted by its home state.  It moved to Wheeling and was mustered in on July 10, 1861.
Company "K" from Parkersburg, Virginia (now West Virginia) was mustered in there on July 21, 1861.

Service
The regiment was converted to the 5th West Virginia Volunteer Cavalry Regiment on January 26, 1864.

Colonels
George R. Latham

See also
West Virginia Units in the Civil War
West Virginia in the Civil War

References

The Civil War Archive

External links
Posthumous Medal Presentation (August 2011) to Pvt. August Sponholtz, KIA on March 10, 1863

Units and formations of the Union Army from West Virginia
1861 establishments in the United States
1864 disestablishments in the United States
Military units and formations established in 1861
Military units and formations disestablished in 1864